Park View Historic District is a national historic district located at Portsmouth, Virginia. It encompasses 295 contributing buildings in a primarily residential section of northeast Portsmouth.  It was developed in the late-19th and early-20th centuries, and includes notable examples of Queen Anne, Colonial Revival, and American Foursquare style single family residences.

It was listed on the National Register of Historic Places in 1984.

References

Historic districts on the National Register of Historic Places in Virginia
Queen Anne architecture in Virginia
Colonial Revival architecture in Virginia
Buildings and structures in Portsmouth, Virginia
National Register of Historic Places in Portsmouth, Virginia